Akelarre is a 1984 Spanish period drama film directed by Pedro Olea. Akelarre means "Witches' Sabbath" in English, and the film is about witchcraft trials directed against the Araitz witches. It was entered into the 34th Berlin International Film Festival.

Cast
 Sílvia Munt as Garazi
 José Luis López Vázquez as Inquisitor
 Mary Carrillo as Amunia
 Walter Vidarte as Don Fermín de Andueza
 Patxi Bisquert as Unai
 Iñaki Miramón as Íñigo
 Mikel Garmendia
 Javier Loyola as Prior
 Sergio Mendizábal as Antxón
 Félix Rotaeta as J. de Areso

References

External links

1984 films
1980s Spanish-language films
1984 drama films
Films directed by Pedro Olea
Spanish drama films
1980s Spanish films